The dark-necked tailorbird (Orthotomus atrogularis) is a songbird species. Formerly placed in the "Old World warbler" assemblage, it is now placed in the family Cisticolidae.

It is found in Bangladesh, Northeast India and Southeast Asia. Its natural habitats are subtropical or tropical moist lowland forest and subtropical or tropical mangrove forest.

References

dark-necked tailorbird
Birds of Bangladesh
Birds of Northeast India
Birds of Southeast Asia
dark-necked tailorbird
Taxonomy articles created by Polbot